Rockhurst University is a private Jesuit university in Kansas City, Missouri. Founded in 1910 as Rockhurst College, Rockhurst University is accredited by the Higher Learning Commission. It enrolled 2,980 students in 2019.

History
In 1909, Fr. Michael Dowling, S.J.,  the founder of Rockhurst, purchased  of land at 53rd Street and Troost Avenue in Kansas City, Missouri for $50,000.  Rockhurst was chartered by the state as Rockhurst College in August 1910.  It included the Academy of Rockhurst College, an institution of secondary education which became Rockhurst High School in 1923, though the two remained under a single corporate umbrella until the high school moved onto its own campus in 1962.

Sedgwick Hall was constructed in 1914, allowing the opening of high school classes, and college classes began in 1917, all held within the same building. The first Rockhurst University students were all taught by Alphonse Schwitalla. The first class graduated in 1921.  In 1939, Rockhurst was granted accreditation by the North Central Association. In 1969 all divisions of Rockhurst became coeducational.  In 1999, Rockhurst College officially changed its name to Rockhurst University.  In October 2006, Rockhurst officially installed its fourteenth president, Thomas Curran, a Catholic priest and the school's first non-Jesuit president. In May 2015, Curran took his finals vows to become a Jesuit. Rockhurst and Research College of Nursing jointly announced in 2018 that they were ending their partnership. In 2020, Saint Luke's College of Health Sciences merged with Rockhurst University to form the Saint Luke's College of Nursing and Health Sciences at Rockhurst University.

Service education
Rockhurst University adheres to a traditional Ignatian philosophy of educating students not only in academics, but in leadership and service as well. The university stresses a values and ethics based education with an emphasis on lifelong learning.  Graduates from Rockhurst University receive two transcripts: one for academics and another for community service.  97% of all students participate in community service, and every year students complete over 25,000 hours of service to the Kansas City area and worldwide community. Before classes even begin in the fall, the freshmen class joins with upperclassmen and university Regents for the Finucane Service Project as part of the Orientation program.  Over 550 people participated in the Finucane project last fall, logging over 1,200 hours of service in a two-hour period. The university sponsors numerous annual service trips within the United States, as well as in Guatemala, Belize, Ecuador, Honduras, Mexico, El Salvador, The Bahamas and other developing countries.

In recognition of its dedication to community service programs, including the number of people who participate in service and the number of service-learning courses, Rockhurst was recognized on the 2008 President's Higher Education Community Service Honor Roll with Distinction, among only 127 schools in the country and one of nine Jesuit schools to receive that honor. Rockhurst has continued to receive this distinction every year since 2007.

In addition to the service completed by its student body, Rockhurst has been recognized as a university by the Carnegie Foundation for the Advancement of Teaching with the foundation's community engagement classification for its ongoing engagement with its neighborhood and the Kansas City community.  Rockhurst was first school in the Kansas City area to receive this honor.

Campus

Rockhurst sits on a  campus located in Kansas City's cultural district, a short distance from the popular shopping and dining center, Country Club Plaza, and just across Troost Avenue from the neighboring University of Missouri–Kansas City.

Housing
The campus is home to three residence halls and the Townhouse Village, offering housing for interested students, as well as university-owned houses on two streets adjacent to campus. McGee Hall typically houses only freshmen women, while Corcoran Hall houses primarily freshmen men. Xavier-Loyola Hall is a co-ed residence hall for upper-class students, mainly consisting of sophomores and juniors, with male and female students living in separate wings. The Townhouse Village houses upper-class students in apartment-style living, with a full kitchen, dining room, living room, and two or three bedrooms. Upper-class students can also apply to live in university-owned houses on residential streets adjacent to campus, giving them the opportunity to live more independently. These houses are deemed "on-campus" and hold groups of 3 to 6 residents.

The quad
The main area of campus, including all classroom buildings, surrounds the quad with the monumental Rockhurst bell tower and adjacent pergola flanking one end. In 2007 the quad has been renamed the Kinerk Commons by the university, in honor of Edward Kinerk, the thirteenth president of the university. The recently renovated Conway Hall is home to the Helzberg School of Management, the university finance office, and university computer services. Sedgwick Hall contains classrooms and faculty offices as well as the Mabee Theatre, where the university's players have put on four productions each year. The Greenlease Library holds the school's volumes of reference books and periodicals. The science center, built in 1996, holds the science classrooms and labs, as well as the doctoral program in physical therapy and doctoral program in occupational therapy. VanAckeren Hall holds the education department, the learning center (open to all students for free tutoring and writing help), and career services, which helps students find jobs and internships across the Midwest. Massman Hall is the center of the campus, both physically and organizationally. The admissions, business, student development, and administrative offices are all in Massman, as well as the cafeteria, the student pub, a coffee shop, Mabee Chapel, a fully equipped fitness and workout facility, and the Rock Room, which is a 24-hour recreational lounge for students.

A major addition to the Rockhurst campus was Arrupe Hall, opening in August 2015, a classroom and faculty office building which includes a 500-seat auditorium. It features versatile classrooms accommodating modern teaching methods and technologies and has a variety of small gathering spaces along the corridors to facilitate sharing and friendship among the students. It was also built with a view to energy conservation and openness to natural light. Its name honors the vision of Jesuit Superior General Pedro Arrupe who coined the term "men and women for others" that has become integral to Jesuit education, and who “called the Society to the service of faith and the promotion of justice. His call clearly resonates with the message from (Jesuit) Pope Francis.”

Athletic facilities
The campus has several athletic facilities, including the soccer stadium, recently renovated with new grass-like turf, a baseball stadium, softball field, and a tennis complex. The Mason-Halpin Fieldhouse holds the basketball and volleyball court, and the adjacent Convocation Center contains a multipurpose court and racquetball courts. The Magis Activity Center, built in 2019, houses workout facilities for students and faculty.

Religious worship facilities
The Campus Ministry Center (CMC) is located in a house adjacent to campus. The CMC is used by the many Campus Ministry programs for their weekly meetings and activities, including the Christian Life Communities (CLCs), student-led faith sharing and reflection groups. Within Massman Hall is the Mabee Chapel, where daily mass is held each school day, and where student devotional prayer and praise-and-worship groups meet weekly. Across the street from campus is St. Francis Xavier Church, a Jesuit parish church, used by the university for student masses every Sunday evening.

Community center
The Rockhurst University Community Center is located at 54th and Troost, where children's literacy programs, community programs, and the RU College Bound high school tutoring program all are held. The Community Center serves as a physical link between the university and the surrounding neighborhood.

Academics

Rockhurst University offers over fifty graduate and undergraduate programs, serving over 3,000 students annually. The core undergraduate curriculum is designed to shape students into leaders who are engaged in the world around them in whatever path they choose, and the graduate programs aim to prepare professional leaders with a hands-on curriculum, nationally recognized faculty and flexible schedules. Rockhurst University operates under one president, but has the following schools with their own deans or directors: College of Arts and Sciences, College of Business, Influence, and Information Analysis, and Saint Luke's College of Nursing and Health Sciences.

In 2018, U.S. News & World Report ranked Rockhurst University as the 11th best institution among Midwest regional universities, up from No. 15 in previous years. The Helzberg School of Management earned several top accolades, including the school's undergraduate management program listed at No. 11 (tied with the University of Notre Dame), and the undergraduate quantitative analysis program listed at No. 9 (one spot behind the University of Michigan).

Campus ministry

Rockhurst University's campus ministry offers many opportunities for students and staff to live out the school's Catholic, Jesuit tradition.  They offer daily mass in the Mabee Chapel every weekday at noon, as well as a student mass every Sunday at 6:00 pm at St. Francis Xavier Parish. Campus ministry also offers RCIA to any interested students.

Christian Life Communities (CLCs) are student-led faith-sharing and reflection groups that meet for an hour each week as small groups. Unity, a gay-straight alliance that meets weekly for prayer, support and service, is open to students of all faith traditions and sexual orientations. Voices for Justice is a student-led social justice group that explores the justice implications of Christianity and raises awareness of social justice issues on campus and beyond. People for People is a group of students exploring issues relating to the respect for life.

The Campus Ministry Center (CMC) is a house located just off-campus across Rockhurst Road from Conway Hall. Christian Life Communities, Voices for Justice,  Unity, and People for People all hold their meetings in the CMC, and Campus Ministry offers several social activities in the CMC during the school year.

Retreats
Campus Ministry runs several different retreat programs during the academic year. The Frosh Getaway, offered annually on a September weekend, is an opportunity for freshmen, led by sophomore leaders, to get to know their new classmates and to adjust to college life with a fun stress-free weekend. The Retreat on the Rock is designed as a college adaptation of Kairos-style retreats. The Fifth Week Retreat is intended as a follow-up to Kairos, Search, TEC, Retreat on the Rock, or similar style retreats, offering ample time for personal reflection and group discussion. The Busy Persons Retreat, offered annually in the spring, is an opportunity for spiritual guidance and reflection within the context and schedule demands of daily college life. The SuperNatural Christian's retreat is a six-day backpacking retreat in upper Michigan's Sylvania Wilderness Tract. This retreat is offered biannually along with the Lumberjack Service Retreat, which offers students the chance to travel to Michigan's Keweenaw Peninsula (specifically the town of Hancock) and chop wood for elderly residents of the area.

Athletics
Rockhurst University is home to the Hawks, the university's athletic program.  After a generation in the NAIA, Rockhurst University joined NCAA Division II in 1999, as a founder of the Heartland Conference.  In 2005 it moved to the Great Lakes Valley Conference.  In July 2009 the Mid-America Intercollegiate Athletics Association (MIAA) rejected a proposal for Rockhurst to join the conference to compete with geographically closer teams. The MIAA said at that moment it currently did not want to expand beyond 12 teams.

Rockhurst has 15 varsity athletic teams, including men's and women's basketball, cross country, soccer, golf, lacrosse and tennis, men's baseball, women's softball, and women's volleyball. The school also offers two club sports: tennis and the Spirit Squad, composed of the Dance Team and the coed cheerleading squad.  It is a popular joke around campus that the Rockhurst University football team has remained undefeated since 1949 (the year that the team was dissolved).

The university will add seven NCAA sports in the coming years. First, in the 2023–24 school year, swimming & diving, plus indoor and outdoor track & field, will be added for both sexes. All of these sports are already sponsored by the GLVC. Then, in 2024–25, men's volleyball will be added. That team will be a de facto NCAA Division I program; the NCAA holds a combined championship for Divisions I and II, and scholarship limits are identical between the two divisions. In addition to the new varsity sports, competitive cheerleading and dance teams will be added in 2023–24.

The Rockhurst men's soccer team competed in the NAIA from 1973 to 1997, Rockhurst played in 17 national tournaments, advanced to the Final Four 10 times, and finished national runner-up four times in 1973, 1976, 1979, and 1997. Since joining the NCAA in 1998, the soccer team has played in 19 national tournaments, advancing to the Final Four 3 times (2013, 2015, and 2016).

In 2013, Rockhurst University added three varsity athletic teams: men's and women's lacrosse and women's cross country.

There is also an intramurals program on campus, with many students participating in a 30-event program throughout the school year.

National rankings
Since becoming an NCAA Division II member institution in 1998, Rockhurst men's soccer has finished in the final Top 25 Poll 10 times, and since 2011, the Hawks have finished in the top 10 each season. Men's soccer finished #3 in the nation in 2015 and 2016.

Men's soccer coach Tony Tocco has coached for 46 seasons and led the team to 13 Final Four appearances. At the end of the 2016 season, Tocco's 680 career victories ranks second in men's college soccer history, three fewer than Ohio Wesleyan head coach Jay Martin.

Following the 2007–2008 school year, Rockhurst was recognized by the National Soccer Coaches Association of America as one of 67 colleges and universities in the nation (among all NCAA and NAIA divisions) to have both men's and women's soccer teams receive the NSCAA Team Academic Award.  To receive the award, a team must achieve a grade point average of 3.0 or higher. The women's soccer team achieved a 3.62 GPA, ranking them #4 in the nation.

Rockhurst University alumnus, Kyle Miller (class of 2011), recently signed with the MLS Sporting Kansas City soccer team in Kansas City, Kansas, for the 2012 season.

Student activities
Rockhurst students participate in many diverse activities throughout the school year both on campus and within the wider community.  Some general campus organizations include:

 Active Minds
 Alpha Phi Omega (APO) service fraternity
 American Humanics Student Association (AHSA)
 Art Club
 Biology Club
 Black Student Union (BSU)
 Cheerleading/Dance Team
 Chorus
 Commuter Club 
 Delta Sigma Pi (Deltasig) professional business fraternity
 Education Club
 English Club (Walter J. Ong Society for Literary Study)
 Fellowship of Christian Athletes (FCA)
 French Club
 Hawks for Life
 Hockey Club
 International Students Club
 Lacrosse Club
 Math & Physics Club
 PEERS (Positively Educating Each Rockhurst Student)

 Phi Delta Epsilon (Pre-Medical Fraternity)
 Players
 Pre-Law Club
 Pre-Medical Club
 Pre-Physical Therapy/Occupational Therapy Club (Pre- PT/OT)
 Psychology Club
 RAKERS (Random Acts of Kindness Sharers)
 The Rock Yearbook
 Rockhurst Organization of Collegiate Women (ROCW)
 Rockhurst Republicans
 Running Club
 The Rockhurst Sentinel Newspaper
 Student Activities Board
 Society for the Advancement of Pre-Medical Studies
 Student Occupational Therapy Association (SOTA)
 Student Organization of Latinos (SOL)
 Student Senate
 UNITY
 VOICES for JUSTICE (VOICES)

Rockhurst has several academic honorary societies (membership by invitation only):

 Alpha Psi Omega (Theatre)
 Alpha Sigma Nu (Jesuit)
 Beta Beta Beta (Biology)
 Kappa Delta Pi (Education)
 Phi Alpha Theta (History)
 Phi Lambda Upsilon (Chemistry)
 Phi Sigma Tau (Philosophy)

 Pi Delta Phi (French)
 Psi Chi (Psychology)
 Sigma Delta Pi Hispanic Honor Society (Hispanic)
 Sigma Tau Delta (English)
 Sigma Theta Tau (Nursing)
 Theta Alpha Kappa (Theology)

Greek life
Rockhurst's Greek life consists of five fraternities and four sororities (totaling over 30% of the undergraduate population):

Fraternities
 Alpha Delta Gamma (Zeta Chapter)
 Pi Kappa Alpha (Kappa Epsilon Chapter)
 Sigma Alpha Epsilon (Missouri Delta Chapter)
 Tau Kappa Epsilon (Kappa Nu Colony)
 Beta Theta Pi (Rockhurst Colony)
Sororities
 Gamma Phi Beta (Eta Iota Chapter)
 Alpha Sigma Alpha (Zeta Eta Chapter)
 Theta Phi Alpha(Gamma Nu Chapter)
 Zeta Tau Alpha (Kappa Eta Chapter)

Notable alumni
 
Hector Barreto Jr., B.S.B.A., 21st Administrator of the U.S. Small Business Administration
Tom Dempsey, restaurateur, current Republican State Senator
Wild Bill Elliott, B-Western star best known for playing Red Ryder
Tommy Frevert, American football player
Diego Gutierrez, '05, midfielder for the Major League Soccer team Chicago Fire
Tommy Heinemann, '09, forward for the USL First Division (USL-1) team Charleston Battery
Herbert Harris, B.A. '48, former member of the United States House of Representatives
Sly James, B.A. '80, Kansas City mayor
Mark Lamping, B.A., former President of the St. Louis Cardinals baseball team, now CEO of the Meadowlands Stadium Company
Phillip H. Muller, Permanent Representative of the Republic of the Marshall Islands to the United Nations
Walter Ong, S.J., B.A. '33, philosopher
G. Joseph Pierron, '68, American judge serving on the Kansas Court of Appeals.
Bill Reardon, B.A. '63, former Kansas State Representative
Joe Reardon, '90, 27th Mayor of the City of Kansas City, Kansas
Michael P. Ryan, Marine Major general
Joseph P. Teasdale, former Governor of Missouri
Denny Thum, ’74, former President of the National Football League's Kansas City Chiefs.
Josh Tols, baseball pitcher
Joseph J. Urusemal, '76, sixth President of the Federated States of Micronesia
George Wendt, B.A., actor best known for his portrayal of "Norm" on the sitcom Cheers

Gallery

See also
 List of Jesuit sites

References

External links

 

 
Roman Catholic Diocese of Kansas City–Saint Joseph
Educational institutions established in 1910
Jesuit universities and colleges in the United States
Universities and colleges in Kansas City, Missouri
1910 establishments in Missouri
Private universities and colleges in Missouri
Catholic universities and colleges in Missouri
Universities and colleges accredited by the Higher Learning Commission